Kassiopi is a fishing village on the affluent northeast coast of Corfu, Greece. It is in the municipal unit of Kassopaia. Historically a small traditional fishing village, its surroundings have largely been developed with luxury villas. Kassiopi remains a summer social centre heavily visited by tourists, particularly popular with visitors from the United Kingdom and Italy.

Demographics

History
The town is said to have been founded during the reign of Pyrrhus, King of Epirus in the 3rd century BC, as a supply post during his war with Rome. After the Roman conquest of the island in 230 BC, many emperors visited, most prominently Emperor Nero, who came to a Temple to Zeus here.

Much of a small headland to the north of the resort is taken up by a Byzantine fortress. The fortress was subsequently fortified further by the Venetians, and survived sieges from the Ottoman Turks in the 16th century. Today parts of the fortress's walls can be seen from the coastal road around the headland.

About Kassiopi
Uniquely on this coast, as well as the ubiquitous "tourist shops" and every kind of eating and drinking facility, there are banks with cash machines, doctors and pharmacies, internet cafes and supermarkets, a primary school and an Orthodox church, travel agents and a police station. The High School of Kassiopi is located just outside the main village in the neighbourhood of Imerolia.

Motor boats, which can be driven by children or adults during the daytime only, are available for hire by the day or week. Excursions run daily from the harbour to all parts of the island.

In an attempt to alleviate the traffic density that occurred around the harbour, a Car and Coach Park is provided at the top of the village. One or two taxis (which run 24 hours a day all over the island) are based here. Both the village and its surrounding areas are safe at all times of the day, with crime rates having remained consistently low for the whole northeast coast.

Sometime in the 5th century the temple of Kassios Zeus was converted to a Christian church to honour the Holy Mother – Panayia Kassopitra. In 1537 the church was burned to the ground by the Turks, it was restored between 1590 and 1591. The new church had two altars to accommodate both Catholic and Orthodox religions and inscriptions on the church bear the dates 1590, 1670 and 1832.

See also
Kassiopi Castle
List of settlements in the Corfu regional unit

References

Populated places in Corfu (regional unit)